Thomas Vincent Emerson  (born 29 September 1970, in Paris) is a British architect based in London and Zürich. His practice, 6a architects, founded with Stephanie Macdonald in 2001 is best known for designing buildings for the arts and education for which it has won several RIBA Awards and the Schelling Medal for architecture. He was appointed Officer of the Order of the British Empire (OBE) in the 2021 New Year Honours for services to architecture and education.

Education 
Emerson was born in France and brought up in Belgium. For his studies, he came to the United Kingdom. He studied architecture at the University of Bath, the University of Cambridge and at the Royal College of Art where he met his partner Macdonald.

Architectural work 
In 2001, Emerson founded 6a architects alongside Macdonald. Projects have included Raven Row, 2009, South London Gallery 2010-18 incorporating a garden by Gabriel Orozco and the conversion of the Fire Station, the V&A fashion gallery, Sadie Coles HQ in London and MK Gallery in Milton Keynes winner of an RIBA South Award in 2021. The studio complex for Juergen Teller won RIBA London Building of the Year 2017 and was nominated for the Stirling Prize 2017. 6a architects' competition-winning design for a new court at Churchill College Cambridge was completed in 2016. Works by 6a architects are particularly noted for their use of materials of strong relationship to landscape and gardens.

Academic work and teaching 
Since 2010 he has been Professor of Architecture and Construction at the ETH Zurich Faculty of Architecture, where he is also Dean since 2021. As part of his teaching and research on landscape and making, his students produced the Pavilion of Reflections floating on Lake Zurich for Manifesta 11 and urban landscape studies on Forst, Galway and Glasgow which was exhibited at Glasgow International in 2016. Before ETH Zurich, he taught architecture at the Architectural Association (2000–04) and the University of Cambridge (2004–10). He was awarded the Conrad Ferdinand Meyer Prize in 2018 for his academic work with ETH.

Emerson has written several academic journal articles including for AA Files, as well as articles for Architects' Journal.

Personal life 
Tom Emerson lives in London and Zürich. In London, he lives with his partner Stephanie Macdonald and their son Laurie, born in 1999.

Projects by 6a architects
Oki-ni, Savile Row, London, 2001
Raven Row, Contemporary Art Exhibition Centre, Spitalfields, London, 2009
South London Gallery, London, 2010
Fashion Galleries, Victoria & Albert Museum, London, 2012
Romney's House, Hampstead, London, 2012
Tree House, London, London, 2013
Façade for Paul Smith, Albemarle Street, London, 2013
Studio for Juergen Teller, London, 2016
Cowan Court, Churchill College Cambridge, 2015–16
Black Stone Building, London, 2017
Coastal House, Devon, 2017
Blue Mountain School, London, 2018
MK Gallery, Milton Keynes, 2019

Bibliography 
 Never Modern by 6a architects and Irénée Scalbert, Park Books, Zurich, 2013, 
 6a architects 2009–17, El Croquis, no. 192, 2017,

References

External links
 Professor Tom Emerson Chair of Architecture and Construction ETH Zurich
 6a architects
 MK Gallery review in The Observer
 Juergen Teller Studio in The Observer
 Jonathan Glancey Raven Row art gallery: east London architecture at its finest Guardian Review
 Edwin Heathcote Financial Times Review
 Icon Magazine feature on 6a architects

Living people
21st-century British architects
1970 births
British expatriates in Switzerland
Officers of the Order of the British Empire